Leon Bleecker (c. 1881, Mizil – October 8, 1933) was an American lawyer and politician from New York.

Life
He was born about 1881 in Romania. The family emigrated to the United States and settled in Manhattan. He practiced law in New York City.

In November 1913, he was elected on the Progressive and Republican tickets to the New York State Assembly (New York Co., 10th D.), defeating Democrat Walter M. Friedland. Bleecker polled 3,246 votes, and Friedland polled 2,044. Bleecker was a member of the 137th New York State Legislature in 1914.

In November 1915, Bleecker was again elected to the Assembly, defeating the incumbent Friedland. Bleecker polled 2,375 votes, and Friedland polled 2,145. Bleecker was a member of the 139th New York State Legislature in 1916.

He died on October 8, 1933.

References

1880s births
1933 deaths
People from Manhattan
Republican Party members of the New York State Assembly
New York (state) Progressives (1912)
20th-century American politicians
Romanian emigrants to the United States